Ronald Alexander Stuart (23 April 1929 – 9 September 1983) was a Canadian basketball player. He competed in the men's tournament at the 1956 Summer Olympics. Stuart committed suicide by carbon monoxide poisoning in 1983.

References

1929 births
1983 suicides
Canadian men's basketball players
Olympic basketball players of Canada
Basketball people from British Columbia
Basketball players at the 1956 Summer Olympics
Sportspeople from Edmonton
Suicides in British Columbia
Suicides by carbon monoxide poisoning